This is a list of the Fall 1979 PGA Tour Qualifying School graduates.

Tournament summary 
One of the regional qualifying events was at Boca Lago Golf Course in Boca Raton, Florida. The top 15 players moved on to the finals. Among the notable qualifiers at that event were Rick Vershure, Kenny Knox, Wally Kuchar, and Mike Donald.

List of graduates 

Source:

References 

1979 2
PGA Tour Qualifying School
PGA Tour Qualifying School